Mahanagaramlo Mayagadu is a 1984 Indian Telugu-language film directed by Vijaya Bapineedu. The film stars Chiranjeevi and Vijayashanti.

Plot
Chiranjeevi plays the role of Raja, whose main aims are to make money by hook or by crook, and get his sister married. His father commits suicide after being accused of theft and his mother dies of disease. Unable to bear the poverty in his village, he leaves his sister at his friend's place and ends up in the city, using the name Mayagadu, making money by every possible means. He ends up in a police colony, in Sub-inspector Allu's house as a preacher. Vijayasanthi, who knows his real identity, tries in every possible way to get him out of that place and finally succeeds. But later when she learns Raja's bitter past, she decides to help him. Giribabu, who is son-in-law of the SP, hates his wife and has an affair with Chanchala (Jayamalini), who is a dancer at a club. This club is managed by Jyothilaxmi, who is Nutan Prasad's wife, but lives with the club's owner. Giribabu plans to kill his wife, but instead unknowingly ties up his lover in a bag and throws her in a river. Raja's brother-in-law notices this and saves her, but is framed in her murder case and jailed. Later Raja realizes his mistake and frees him from police custody. On his way to find out the real culprit, he realizes that Chanchala is alive and that the club owners killed another dancer and framed him to save Giribabu. Meanwhile, Raja's sister arrives in the city in search of her husband and brother, and stays at the SP's house. Raja deceives the SP and brings her out and with the help of Nutan Prasad, who is the nephew of the SP, unfolds the details of the case and frees his brother-in-law.

Cast
Chiranjeevi as Raja	
Vijayshanti	
Allu Rama Lingaiah	
Rao Gopal Rao
Sangeeta	
Nutan Prasad
Giri Babu	
Nirmalamma	
Jayamalini
Balaji
Chandrika
Jyothi Lakshmi
 T. S. B. K. Moulee
Allu Aravind

Soundtrack

 "Hari Katha" -
 "Mahanagaramlo Mayagadu" -
 "Vuduku Vuduku" -
 "Yedhava Vatti Yedhava" -

External links

1984 films
Films scored by Satyam (composer)
1980s Telugu-language films